Brazil competed at the modern Olympic Games for the first time at the 1920 Summer Olympics in Antwerp, Belgium. 19 competitors, all men, took part in 10 events in 5 sports.

Brazil won its first ever Olympic medals in Antwerp. All the three medals came in Shooting events. The five shooters had great difficulty getting to the Antwerp. First, the shooters boarded the Curvello steamship with the rest of the Brazilian delegation, but they had to go down in Portugal when they learned that the ship would not arrive in time for the competition. Then they took a train from Lisbon to Paris, and much of the trip was in an open car, with the athletes being exposed to rain and sun. In Paris, they changed trains, heading for Belgium. But in Brussels, where they expected the connection to Antwerp, some of the weapons and ammunition had been stolen. The athletes had 200 caliber 8 bullets, although they needed at least 75 for each. They made friends with the American athletes Alfred Lane and Raymond Bracken, who gave the Brazilians 2,000 cartridges and 50 targets.

On August 2, Brazil had already started the men's 50 metre team free pistol, with Fernando Soledade. As his weapon was very bad, the head of the American shooting team, Colonel Snyders, lent the Brazilians two weapons manufactured by Colt especially for the competition. The shooters Sebastião Wolf, Dario Barbosa, Guilherme Paraense and Afrânio da Costa exchanged the weapons among themselves and won the bronze medal for men's 50 metre team free pistol. The individual event was simultaneous with the team event, so Afrânio da Costa also got the individual silver medal, in men's 50 metre free pistol, the first individual medal ever won by a Brazilian .

The next day, Guilherme Paraense, a Lieutenant of the Army, became the first ever gold medalist from Brazil, when he won the 30 metre military pistol event.

Medalists

Multiple medallists

The following competitors won several medals at the 1920 Olympic Games.

Diving

A single diver represented Brazil in the nation's Olympic debut in 1920. Wellisch competed in all three of the men's events, reaching the final in two but winning no medals.

 Men
Ranks given are within the semifinal group.

Rowing

Five rowers represented Brazil in 1920. It was the nation's debut in the sport. Brazil sent one boat, in the coxed fours. It was unable to advance past the semifinals, taking second place to the United States in the three-boat heat. 
Ranks given are within the heat.
Men

Shooting

Five shooters represented Brazil in 1920. It was the nation's debut in the sport as well as the Olympics. All three of Brazil's medals at the Antwerp Games came in shooting events, with one of each type.
Men

Swimming

Two swimmers, both male, represented Brazil in 1920. It was the nation's debut in the sport as well as the Olympics. Neither swimmer advanced past the quarterfinals.
 Men

Water polo

Brazil competed in the Olympic water polo tournament for the first time in 1920. A modified version of the Bergvall System was in use at the time. Brazil won its first match, against France, before being defeated by Sweden in the quarterfinals.

 Round of 16

 Quarterfinals

 
Roster

Orlando Amêndola
Victorino Fernandes
Ângelo Gammaro
João Jório
Edgard Leite
Mangangá
Alcides Paiva
Abrahão Saliture

References

External links
Official Olympic Reports
International Olympic Committee results database

Nations at the 1920 Summer Olympics
1920
Olympics